Little Things is an original novel based on the U.S. television series Buffy the Vampire Slayer.

Plot summary

Ever since her mother's death, Buffy has been having problems keeping herself and Dawn living together peacefully, and the lack of money is affecting both of them. When Buffy suddenly develops an acute toothache, with no dental insurance, she can't afford to have it fixed. She must bear through the pain and keep it a secret from her friends while the town of Sunnydale becomes terrorized by miniature vampires. The miniature vampire fairies are led by Queen Mab who has come to Sunnydale with her troop in order to hunt down Anyanka. Back in the day, Anyanka was accidentally involved in turning these fairies into vampires and Queen Mab wants revenge on this act. Unfortunately, Buffy has to figure out how to kill vampires that are smaller than her palm.

Continuity

Supposed to be set in Buffy season 5.

Canonical issues

Buffy books such as this one are not usually considered by fans as canonical. Some fans consider them stories from the imaginations of authors and artists, while other fans consider them as taking place in an alternative fictional reality. However unlike fan fiction, overviews summarising their story, written early in the writing process, were 'approved' by both Fox and Joss Whedon (or his office), and the books were therefore later published as officially Buffy/Angel merchandise.

External links

Reviews
Litefoot1969.bravepages.com - Review of this book by Litefoot
Teen-books.com - Reviews of this book
Nika-summers.com - Review of this book by Nika Summers

2002 American novels
Books based on Buffy the Vampire Slayer
Pocket Books books